Petra Sochorová ( Blažková, born 22 June 1978) is a Czech chess player. She received the FIDE title of Woman International Master (WIM) in 1999. She is a five-time medalist of the Czech Women's Chess Championship (1998, 2001, 2003, 2005, 2012), Open German Women's Championship winner (2006).

Biography
Petra Sochorová is a five-time winner of individual medals in the Czech Women's Chess Championships: two silver (2001, 2012) and three bronze (1998, 2003, 2005). Also she won silver (2005) and bronze (2004) medals at the Czech Women's Rapid Chess Championships. In 2004, Sochorová won Czech Women's Blitz Chess Championship. In 2006, in Bad Königshofen she won Open German Women's Championship.Sochorová played for Czech Republic in the Women's Chess Olympiads:
 In 2004, at first reserve board in the 36th Chess Olympiad (women) in Calvià (+4, =3, -3),
 In 2006, at first reserve board in the 37th Chess Olympiad (women) in Turin (+5, =3, -2).

She played for Czech Republic in the World Women's Team Chess Championship:\
 In 2007, at third board in the 3rd Women's World Team Chess Championship 2007 in Yekaterinburg (+2, =4, -3).

In 1999, Sochorová was awarded the FIDE Woman International Master (WIM) title.

FIDE ratings

References

External links
 
 
 

1978 births
Living people
Czech female chess players
Chess Woman International Masters
Chess Olympiad competitors